Amulets Against the Dragon Forces is a play by Paul Zindel. The play focuses on Chris Boyd, a teenager whose mother cares for the dying. It is set in 1950s Staten Island.

The play was produced Off-Broadway by the Circle Repertory Company, opening on April 6, 1989 and closing on May 7, 1989. Directed by R. Rodney Marriott, the cast included Matt McGrath (actor) (Chris), Loren Dean (Harold), John Spencer (Floyd), Deborah Hedwall (Mrs. Boyd), and Ruby Holbrook (Mrs. DiPardi).

References

1998 plays
Plays by Paul Zindel
Plays set in New York City
Plays set in the 1950s